Downtown Halifax is the primary central business district of the Municipality of Halifax. Located on the central-eastern portion of the Halifax Peninsula, on Halifax Harbour. Along with Downtown Dartmouth, and other de facto central business districts within the Municipality (e.g. Cole Harbour, Lower Sackville, Spryfield), Downtown Halifax serves as the business, entertainment, and tourism hub of the region.

Geography
Downtown is located within the central-eastern portion of the Halifax Peninsula.

Culture

The culture of Downtown Halifax is-influenced-by-and-is-similar-to the culture of Atlantic Canada, but is forever changing. With the ever-diversifying demographics of the Halifax urban area, the stereotypical idiosyncracies that are often associated with people from Atlantic Canada are slowly withering. The rapid growth of the area between 2016-and-2021 showed not only the diversification, importance, and resilience of Downtown Halifax, but of the Municipality and of the urban area of Halifax itself.

Events and festivals
The Scotiabank Centre is one of the largest buildings in Downtown Halifax, as well as the largest arena in Atlantic Canada. It is the home of the Halifax Mooseheads hockey team, and it also plays host to most of the major sporting events and concerts that visit Halifax. The Nova Scotia International Tattoo is held here every year. It is connected to the Downtown Halifax Link, and directly to the World Trade and Convention Centre. The Atlantic Film Festival, Atlantic Jazz Festival and the Halifax Pop Explosion also take place in some downtown venues.

Demographics
Statistics Canada's 2021 Census article Table 5 Population by proximity to downtown, census metropolitan areas, 2016 to 2021 recorded 25,555 people who lived within Downtown Halifax.

From 2016 to 2021, the population increased by 5,288 people (an increase of over 26%) from the 2016 population of 20,267 people. 

Furthermore, the population density of the area increased from approximately 49 people per hectare in 2016 to approximately 62 people per hectare in 2021. Between 2016 and 2021, Downtown Halifax's population fastest compared to all other Downtowns in Canada.

Economy

Downtown Halifax, like the municipality and the urban area, has a very diverse economy. Many Crown corporations, non-governmental organizations, and private-sector organizations, have corporate headquarters and/or do business within downtown. As the most populous downtown in Atlantic Canada, that is encompassed by the most populous municipality--and--most populous urban area within Atlantic Canada, Downtown Halifax is a bustling area that hosts many industries.

Financial services
Downtown Halifax is the financial centre of the urban area of Halifax, the Province of Nova Scotia, and the region of Atlantic Canada. The Bank of Canada has one of its five Canadian regional offices located within the central business district, and all Big Five Canadian banks have major operations within the area. Manulife, along with many other private financial institutions, also do business within downtown.

Gambling
Nova Scotia Gaming Corporation operates its headquarters at 1601 Lower Water Street.

Marketing communications
Trampoline is located within the area.

Telecommunication
Eastlink, a cable television and telecommunications company is headquartered within the vicinity.

Transportation
Maritime Bus operates a station within the district.

Utilities
Emera, the Canadian successor holding company, is headquartered in Downtown Halifax. Its Nova Scotia subsidiary, Nova Scotia Power, used to be a Provincial Crown corporation until Progressive Conservative Party of Nova Scotia leader Donald Cameron privatized the company in 1992.

Parks and recreation

Downtown Halifax has an array of attractions, a plethora of events-and-festivals, and many restaurants.

Accommodation
Many of the Halifax region's hotels are located in the downtown area, with many major hotel chains maintaining a location here. There are also a number of small hostels nearby.

Hotels within Downtown

Art galleries
There are several art galleries within the Downtown Halifax area:

Argyle Fine Art
Art 1274 Hollis
Centre for Craft Nova Scotia
Anna Leonowens Gallery
Khyber Centre for the Arts
Port Loggia Gallery
Karl Penton Gallery
The Prow Gallery
Studio 21 Fine Art
Teichert Gallery
Zwicker's Gallery

Landmarks

Boardwalk
The Halifax Waterfront Boardwalk runs along the harbour from Casino Nova Scotia in the northern-part of Downtown-to-the Canadian Museum of Immigration at Pier 21 in the southern-part of Downtown.

Old Town Clock
On 20 October 1803, Halifax's town clock started keeping time. Located off Brunswick Street, the clock faces the harbour and is another example of Palladian architecture within the urban area of Halifax.

Citadel Hill
Citadel Hill, a  star-shaped fort, is another historic attraction in the downtown. Originally established with the arrival of Edward Cornwallis and the out break of Father Le Loutre's War (1749), the current fort was built in the Victorian Era as the hub of the historic defence system for the port. As a result, there is viewplane legislation that restricts vertical development that might block the direct line of sight from Citadel Hill to the harbour and George's Island in particular. Recent developments have challenged the viewplane limits.

Province House
Finished construction in 1819, Province House is a fantastic example of Palladian architecture in North America.

Granville Mall

One of the few blocks to have retained its heritage character is Granville Mall, a pedestrian mall formerly part of Granville Street, made up of an array of shops and pubs in a conglomeration of rowed historic buildings built in the 1860s. It is known for the stone facades on each building. Historic Properties, a collection of 19th-century warehouses converted into shops and restaurants, is located nearby. Despite the heritage focus of these remaining blocks of heritage buildings, none are protected as heritage districts.

Museums
Downtown Halifax hosts several museums, including:

Canadian Museum of Immigration at Pier 21
Maritime Museum of the Atlantic
Nova Scotia Museum of Natural History
Sea Turtle Centre

Pier 21, an immigrant entry point prominent throughout the 1930s, 1940s, and 1950s, was opened to the public as a National Historic Site of Canada in 1999. In summertime the preserved World War II corvette  operates as a museum ship and Canada's naval memorial. The Art Gallery of Nova Scotia is housed in a 150-year-old building containing over 9,000 works of art.

Parks
There are a number of parks within the urban setting of Downtown Halifax.

Citadel Hill off-leash dog park
Halifax Commons
Halifax Public Gardens
Peace and Friendship Park
Victoria Park

Restaurants and nightlife

The area is home to approximately 200 restaurants and bars, providing an interesting array of world cuisine. There are also over 60 sidewalk cafes that open in the summer months. The nightlife is made up of bars and small music venues as well as Casino Nova Scotia, a large facility built partially over the water. Pizza Corner, located at the intersection of Blowers Street and Grafton Street, is a common location for pizzerias serving Halifax-style donairs and other street food for the neighbouring bars and pubs.

Shopping
Downtown Halifax, being home to many small shops and vendors, is a major shopping area in the Municipality of Halifax. Notable retail areas include Park Lane, Spring Garden Road and Scotia Square.

Theatre
Neptune Theatre, located on Argyle Street, is Halifax's largest theatre with a 458-person capacity. Since 1 July 1963, it has performed, and performs an assortment of professionally produced plays year-round.

The Shakespeare by the Sea theatre company performs at nearby Point Pleasant Park. 

Although not in Downtown Halifax, the Eastern Front Theatre performs at Alderney Landing in Downtown Dartmouth which is accessible from the area via the Halifax Transit ferry service.

Venues

Nova Centre

Scotiabank Centre
Formerly, and colloquially, known as the Halifax Metro Centre, the Scotiabank Centre was opened on 17 February 1978. It has a concert-capacity of up-to 13,000-people, and has hosted bands-and-musicians, comedians, multi-sport events and motivational speakers.

Government

Downtown Halifax is the home of the Halifax Regional Council chamber at Halifax City Hall. Offices for the mayor, city councillors, and additional staff can also be found downtown.

At the provincial level, the downtown area is the home of Nova Scotia's Province House where the Nova Scotia House of Assembly meets. Government House, where the Lieutenant-Governor resides, is located on Barrington Street. The provincial government also has offices in several other downtown office buildings.

Canada's federal government also maintains a significant presence in the area, working from various buildings including the Dominion Public Building, the Ralston Building, and previously, the Maritime Centre.

Transportation

Pedestrian
Streets within Downtown Halifax are set in a grid-pattern. Pedestrians are recommended to be cautious, to know your route, and to use good footwear. Downtown Halifax is similar to other central business districts where it has many varied crosswalks, hills, paths, and sidewalks.

Barrington Street traverses approximately  through Downtown in a north-south direction.

Road
The streets in the downtown area are set in a grid pattern like the rest of the Halifax Peninsula, the way the town officials originally planned in the 18th century.

Public transit
Halifax Transit provides public transit routes from several points throughout Downtown Halifax via different modes of transport.

Bus routes

Lower Water Street terminal
Route 2 (Fairview)
Route 29 (Barrington)
Route 90 (Larry Uteck)

Scotia Square terminal
Route 1 (Spring Garden)
Route 2 (Fairview)
Route 5 (Scotia Square)
Route 7 A (Peninsula) (clockwise)
Route 7 B (Peninsula) (counter-clockwise)
Route 8 (Sackville)
Route 9 (Herring Cove)
Route 10 (Dalhousie)
Route 29 (Barrington)
Route 41 (Dalhousie-Dartmouth)
Route 84 (Glendale)
Route 93 (Bedford Highway)
Route 123 (Timberlea Express)
Route 127 (Cowie Hill Express)
Route 135 (Flamingo Express)
Route 136 (Farnham Gate Express)
Route 137 (Clayton Park Express)
Route 138 (Parkland Express)
Route 158 (Woodlawn Express)
Route 159 (Colby Express)
Route 161 (North Preston Express)
Route 165 (Caldwell Express)
Route 168 B (Cherry Brook Express)
Route 182 (First Lake Express)
Route 183 (Springfield Express)
Route 185 (Millwood Express)
Route 186 (Beaver Bank Express)
Route 194 (West Bedford Express)
Route 196 (Basinview Express)
Route 320 (Airport/Fall River MetroX)
Route 330 (Tantallon/Sheldrake Lake Regional Express)
Route 370 (Porters Lake Regional Express)

Ferry routes

Lower Water Street terminal
Alderney (Downtown Dartmouth)
Woodside (Woodside)

See also
 Downtown Halifax Link
 Kate Carmichael
 The Khyber
 Texpark site

References

External links

Halifax Regional Municipality
Downtown Halifax Business Commission
Waterfront Development Corporation Limited
Tourism Nova Scotia

Busking venues
Halifax
Communities in Halifax, Nova Scotia